, also known as Nanbaka - The Numbers, is a Japanese manga series written and illustrated by Shō Futamata. An anime television series adaptation by Satelight aired between 5 October 2016 and 22 March 2017. The title is a play on words, combining the name of the prison, which is the Japanese transcription of the word "number", and the Japanese word "baka" for "fool" or "idiot".

Premise
The story centers around four young men who are assigned to Nanba Prison, the world's most formidable prison. Jyugo, who attempted to break out of prison and ended up extending his jail time; Uno, a gambling fanatic who likes women; Rock, who likes eating and fighting; and Nico, an ex drug addict who happens to be an otaku. The action follows the daily lives of the prison's inmates and guards.

Characters

Cell 13

Inmate number 1315. He is of Japanese descent, has black hair with red streaks at the end, and has heterochromia; his left eye is green and his right eye is violet. He is confident, cheerful, impulsive and gets bored easily. He is skilled at picking any kind of mechanical or electronic lock. The sole exceptions are the shackles on his neck, wrists and ankles which were placed on him mysteriously when he was asleep by a guard with a scar on the back of his neck. His father was inmate number 610 at Nanba Prison and known as "the shame of Nanba Prison". He hates the guard who placed the shackles on him, and longs to find him and have them removed. He states that he has to be in Nanba Prison as he has been to all other prisons. His name just means 'fifteen'.

Inmate number 1311. He is of British descent, has a long braid, wears a hat, loves women and gambling, and often has a pair of cards on hand. He has a great intuition and is able to make bets on what outcome will occur using his observational skills, luck and intuition. He is kind and outgoing (to the point of being silly) but can be blunt. He is often the one who keeps the others in line when Hajime is not around, and Nico jokes that he is starting to act like he is their mother. He is also very loyal to Jyugo, whom he claims saved his life and gave him his freedom back. After Jyugo is beaten within an inch of his life by Hajime, he holds a deep anger against Hajime, stating he could never come to like prison guards. He broke out of his previous prisons because he had dates to attend.

Inmate number 1369. He is American, has a mohawk, wears long feather earnings, and is the physically largest of his fellow cell mates. He loves fighting and eating and is incredibly strong, with only some of the supervisors being stronger. He can be short tempered and impulsive, but cares for his friends, and mostly remains peaceful and happy. He met Jyugo when the other inmate saved him from starving to death in the first prison he was sent to. He escaped other prisons because the food was terrible, but likes the cooking at Nanba Prison.

Inmate number 1325. An American effeminate short male with green hair and bandages on the right side of his body, predominantly on the right side of his face. He has a chain ball shackled to his right leg. He grew up in the slums, where he was a drug mule, and has escaped multiple prisons primarily because they tried to inject his medicine into him. He is calm at Nanba Prison as the medicine is taken orally and is flavored. Drugs have an unusual effect on him and rather than incapacitate him, they have alternate side effects. He rarely takes anything seriously and is rather childish and happy-go-lucky. He is a huge anime fan. In the second season, it is revealed why he is so ill and dependent on medication. As a child, a drug gang used him to test their products, which made him develop several unknown illnesses. After being arrested, the doctors at the first prison he was sent to performed painful, invasive medical experiments on him under the guise of trying to help him get better, which only made him more ill. After spending years locked in the prison infirmary, he eventually sunk into a deep depression and wished that he could die, until Jyugo freed him and helped him develop an interest in life again. In episode 21, it is revealed that he has a violent split personality that will emerge if his health problems are not kept under control with his medications, but he is unaware of its existence.

Nanba Prison guards

The Building 13 Supervising Officer. A tall, strong and serious bald man who takes his job very seriously and has a cross shaped scar on the left side of his face. He likes shogi and has a black belt in judo. He is likened to a gorilla. He is annoyed by the antics of the Cell 13 inmates and often intercepts them before they escape the prison. He is said to be the strongest of all supervisors in the prison. He is willing to do anything his job dictates, even kill if need be. He is very suspicious of Jyugo, not just because of his father.

The prison warden. She is an intimidating and serious woman with long blue hair and has a crush on Hajime. She is particularly watchful of Jyugo, son of the man known as the "eternal fugitive".

The chief broadcaster. Often covers for Building 13 as a guard when the prisoners escape. He has dark skin, a loud rock star-like personality and usually hosts the events at the prison, such as the New Year's Tournament. He sometimes serves as the narrator for the episodes, often saying things like, "Remember this is still a comedy anime!", when things get serious in the plot. He knows about the Momoko's crush on Hajime and is often beat up by her for daring to tease her about it.

The Building 3 Supervising Officer. He wears a lot of make up and has a somewhat effeminate personality. He insists he is not homosexual despite his personality and appearance. He is likened to a pheasant.

The Building 4 Supervising Officer. He has a crush on Momoko and is well aware that she has a crush on Hajime. He longs to exceed Hajime in order to prove himself to Momoko. He is likened to a dog. His preferred weapon is his whip. He is a hard worker and was a police officer before coming to Nanba Prison. It is suggested that he tried to bring attention to the crimes against prisoners to his superiors while working as a police officer.

The Building 5 Supervising Officer. He has orange hair with green tips, and a red belt used for a tail-like appearance. He is likened to a monkey. He is calm and trusting most of the time, although he is known to become loud and obnoxious when annoyed. Despite this, it is eventually revealed that he actually cares for the prisoners in Building 5 quite a great deal, as he helped Upa reconnect with his family after he was arrested in China, and later took Liang under his wing when the inmate was first transferred to Nanba Prison. In season 2, it is revealed that he has an older brother, Enki, who was the former supervising officer of Building 5; Enki was very popular among both the other guards and the prisoners, however, he secretly tortured and abused the inmates in his care, eventually murdering one of them and going on a rampage when his colleagues tried to arrest him. Samon still struggles to comprehend how his brother could do the things he did, and is often taunted by the other guards, who accuse him of being a traitor like his brother was. He becomes irritated when compared to his older brother and when Hajime is mentioned as he sees Hajime, who was able to capture Enki while Samon himself hesitated, as a painful reminder of how strong he feels he needs to be.

The Building 13 Deputy Supervisor. He appears to be a tall, well-built Japanese man and is rather friendly and silly, often laughing. He has a horrible sense of direction and loves working out. He is very strong and often trains with Tsukumo.

A Building 13 guard under Hajime who often stresses over the fact that the Cell 13 inmates often try to escape. He is a bit of a worrywart and an easy target for the Cell 13 inmates to bully but is otherwise a pleasant person who takes his job seriously. He has long blue hair. He is described as a pretty boy.

The Building 5 Deputy Supervisor under Samon. His face is boar-like, having teeth that mimic such. In season 2, it is revealed that he is actually a mole working for his former supervising officer Enki, when he frees Enki and the prisoners allied with him from their underground cells. He says that he is working with Enki because he wants to see Samon dead, due to how the other guard was chosen as the new Building 5 supervising officer over him; he considers Samon to be weak and cowardly in comparison to his older brother, and detests having to take orders from him.

He has long white and red hair, with a long ponytail which acts like a tail. He has multiple piercings on his left ear and wears a golden choker. He is usually seen with a serious expression. When he was younger, he was usually seen training. He was strong enough to break a boulder in two with a single strike, mediate underwater and even studied diligently. He also was often seen with Samon by his side. According to Liang and Upa, Enki used to be in charge of a prison in China where he cruelly beat up inmates to become stronger. Upa was nearly killed by his abuse and Liang was terrified at the thought that he would be next but Enki was transferred to Nanba Prison. Formerly the supervising officer of Building 5, he was well-respected and admired by the many fellow guards and even inmates throughout Nanba Prison. He was also considered indispensable to Building 5 and Nanba Prison. However, according to Liang and Upa, Enki had continued to cruelly beat up inmates in Nanba Prison which causes inmates to fear Enki. Enki had built an underground prison beneath Building 5, and has a secret archive room which has data on certain dangerous criminals, later discovered by Jyugo, that Enki was aware that Jyugo was part of a human experiment. After betraying his co-workers and killing an inmate, later revealed to be Elf, he was apprehended and arrested by his co-workers. He now resides in the underground prison of Building 5. Some time ago, Enki faced someone with blades similar to Jyugo. The mysterious person managed to injure Enki's left arm and Enki called him a monster. Since then, Enki was searching for him with the intent to kill him, as he believes the man is too dangerous to let live. During the second season, he is released by Inori and Houzuki. The three join forces with Ruka and Hachiman, who have all allied themselves with Enki. The five proceed to carry out a plan to capture all of the inmates and supervisors, although it is not known exactly what Enki's ultimate goal is. While trying to capture the inmates, he sees Jyugo and plans to kill him, as he believes that he is the man with the blades who attacked him.

A junior guard at Building 5 and the younger brother of Noriko.

Hajime's cute blonde cross-dressing brother who befriends Jyugo. He has a kind and sweet personality and is very girly. He is more or less the opposite of Hajime; slow, clumsy and non-athletic. However, the one trait he shares with his brother is his toughness. Like Hajime, he can withstand abnormal amounts of impact, brushing them off like nothing. Hajime even goes so far as using him as a blunt weapon or projectile.

The Building 2 Deputy Supervisor. He first appeared to be filling in as the Building 8 Supervising Officer. He has a cat-like face and mannerisms.

A Building 5 guard, primarily assigned to organizing the warehouse. He is the twin brother of Kokoriki and the younger brother of Youriki.

A Building 5 guard and former marathon runner. He is the twin brother of Rokuriki and the younger brother of Youriki.

A Building 5 guard and former pro wrestler. He is older brother of Rokuriki and Kokoriki.

Other staff members

The android nurse at Nanba Prison who was created by Okina and Kazari as their "daughter". 

The Building 13 Chef. He was once a prisoner himself, but after serving his sentence, he returned to Nanba to learn cooking and be a chef. He is a massive hulking figure, with a stony, unchanging face. He usually expresses his emotions in actions, like giving Rock a cake, when complimented. However, Rock has also proven to be able to identify certain emotions on his blank face such as happiness, when they obtained a stone oven for the kitchen.

The head doctor at Nanba Prison. 

The head scientist at Nanba Prison.

Other inmates
 

Inmate number 1399. He believes that he is a shinobi (ninja), but his techniques usually fail to work. Ironically, he was born in a ninja village, but even as a child he was terrible. He was found by a movie director, who wanted a real shinobi to cast in her film. She tricked the child into believing that she was his long lost mother, come to take him back, and raised him to be an actor and shinobi. When he discovered the truth he tried to head back to his home village, but got lost and ended up getting arrested for trespassing. After escaping the prison, he was recaptured and sent to Nanba Prison.

Inmate number 4634. He was born with a rare disease that keeps his body temperature much higher than normal and allows him to manifest flames. He would learn to live and adapt with the disease. However, when he went to college in Germany, his condition went out of control. Fellow student Elf took advantage of the situation by framing him for numerous arson crimes in order to make it acceptable for him as a convicted criminal to be used as a test subject. In an act of rebellion, he burned the lab, but his power was suppressed by the Man with the Scar, which led to him being sent to Nanba Prison where he finally found someone who believed his story in Kenshiro. He has since been determined to get revenge against that scientist.

Inmate number 0502. A master martial artist who can usually be found training. He willingly joined the mob as a young boy to save the life of his teacher, who he witnessed nearly being murdered by the mob for refusing their demands. He was supposed to be an assassin for the boss, but he believed that killing was a sin, and instead used a drug created by Qi to knock his targets out while making them appear to be dead. Eventually he was found out by the boss, who rounded up all the people Liang had spared and forced him to watch them be killed before being brutally tortured himself. When the organization was shut down by the police, he was arrested and sent to jail in China. After a short period there, he was transferred to Nanba Prison. He was severely depressed and disillusioned with martial arts by this time, as his years in the mob had damaged his ideals and left him thinking that he could never be a good person after what he had done. Eventually, he was able to rediscover his passion after Samon took him in and began training him. He considers Samon to be his mentor and wants to become stronger so that he can be useful to the guard, who he credits with giving him the will to continue living.

Inmate number 0558. Upa is a powerful qigong master and has a talisman attached to his head to restrict his qi usage. He was kidnapped by the crime syndicate Liang used to work for when he was a child because as the most prodigious member of a powerful clan, his internal organs were worth a great deal of money on the black market. He stayed and worked for the group willingly, as they had promised to return his organs if he proved useful to them. However, it is revealed in season 2 that the organs he received were not his own, but Qi's, who had had his organs transplanted to Upa after he began dying due to his body shutting down. After he was arrested, he was sent to a prison in China, where he unfortunately became a victim of Enki's cruel abuse. However, during this time, he also met Samon after the guard was able to put him back in contact with his family, who had been told by the mob boss that he had died. He highly respects Samon because even though the guard claimed that he was just doing his job, he was the first person to show him any sort of kindness or respect in years. His aim is to finish serving out his sentence and attempt to begin a new, better life alongside Liang and Qi.

Inmate number 0571. A prisoner famous for his skill at making drugs and poisons. He resides in cell block five with Liang and Upa. He is rather lazy, and can usually be seen relaxing or sleeping in the background, to the point that Liang and Upa often call him "lazy trash". He was forced into working for the same people who had taken Liang and Upa to save his own life. He initially was unconcerned about the mob's immoral actives, as he was focused on self preservation, but came to hate them after witnessing the boss abusing Liang and Upa. Unbeknownst to Upa, he even gave him some of his own internal organs to save the young boy's life. Eventually, he discovered that his products were being modified to maim and kill the people who used them and, following his arrest, swore that he would never manufacture drugs or poisons again, as he had come to believe that his talents could only hurt other people. During this time, he also lost his ability to trust others. When he was transferred to Nanba Prison, however, he eventually was able to take up his trade again after being encouraged by Samon. He came to respect Samon for his honesty and kindness, and hopes that he will be able to repay the guard before he is released.

Inmate number 0303. He shares a cell with Honey.

Inmate number 0382. He shares a cell with Trois.

A former guard at Nanba Prison Building 5, and a current inmate there.

Inmate 0508. A former crime boss of the Chinese mafia wearing a pig mask.

Other characters

A mysterious character who framed Musashi for a series of arson crimes.

An unknown figure, who is responsible for Jyugo's irremovable shackles and Musashi's pyrokinesis. His only known feature is a distinctive scar on the back of his neck. His real name is revealed to be .

The older sister of Houzuki and an old friend of Enki and Samon.

Media

Manga
Shō Futamata began serializing the manga on NHN Japan's Comico webtoon app on 13 October 2013. The series is published in print by Futabasha. Crunchyroll Manga acquired the series for digital publication in English.

Volumes

Chapter not yet in tankōbon format
The following chapters have not yet been collected into a tankōbon volume:

Anime
NHN Play Art announced in February 2015 that the series would receive an anime adaptation. The series is directed by Shinji Takamatsu and written by Mitsutaka Hirota, with animation by Satelight. The series premiered on 5 October 2016 on MBS. Crunchyroll licensed the series and simulcasted the anime on their service, and Funimation simulcasted the dub for the series on their service. On 22 November 2016, Crunchyroll announced that it will continue to stream into the second season. An original video animation for the series aired at the "Nanfes" event in April 2017, with the episode later being bundled with the "Nanfes" DVD on 26 July 2017. Crunchyroll later streamed the original video animation on 30 September 2017.

Season 1

Season 2

Special

Notes

References

External links
  at Comico 
  
 

Comedy anime and manga
Crunchyroll anime
Futabasha manga
Funimation
Japanese webcomics
Japanese webtoons
Prisons in anime and manga
Satelight
LGBT in anime and manga